The Midland Counties Miners' Federation was a trade union, representing coal miners in the West Midlands region of England.

History
The union was founded in 1886.  It initially had seven affiliates, including the North Stafford Miners' Association, the Old Hill and Highley District Miners, Enginemen and Surfacemen's Association, the Pelsall District Miners, the Shropshire Miners' Association, and the West Bromwich District Miners.  It affiliated to the Miners' Federation of Great Britain.

By 1893, the federation's affiliates also included the Bristol Miners' Association, Forest of Dean Miners' Association, Somerset Miners' Association, and Warwickshire Miners' Association.  The first three of these accepted reductions in wages which went against federation policy, and therefore left in 1894, recombining as the South-Western Federation.

In 1945, the union became the Midland Area of the National Union of Mineworkers, with less autonomy than before.  It dissolved in 2011.

Affiliates

Leadership

Presidents
1886: Enoch Edwards
1912: Samuel Finney
1930s: F. J. Hancock
1941: John Blakemore?
1950s: Arthur Baddeley
1963: Jack Lally
1983: John Connon

Secretaries
1886: Samuel Henry Whitehouse
1888: Benjamin Dean
1890: Albert Stanley
1915: John Baker?

1930s: George Henry Jones
1948: J. H. Southall
1963: A. M. Jones

1983: Jim Colgan
1990s: Joe Wills

References

Mining trade unions
National Union of Mineworkers (Great Britain)
Politics of the West Midlands (region)
1886 establishments in England
Mining in England
Trade unions established in 1886
Trade unions disestablished in 2011
Trade unions based in Staffordshire